United National Federal Party (UNFP) was a political party in Zimbabwe, formed in November 1978 by Chief Kayisa Ndiweni, who had been a leading figure in the Zimbabwe United People's Organisation. UNFP contested the 1979 election and won 9 seats, mostly in the Matabeleland provinces. It failed to win any seats in the 1980 election.

References

Political parties in Rhodesia
Defunct political parties in Zimbabwe
Political parties established in 1978
1978 establishments in Rhodesia